Valestrandfossen or Valestrandsfossen is a village in the municipality of Osterøy, adjacent to Norway's second-largest city and municipality Bergen, Vestland county. Sites worth mentioning include Hamre and Hamre Church.

Valestrandfossen has shops, a gas station, primary school, hairdressers, pubs, and Lerøy Fossen AS, the world's largest trout smokehouse. 

Valestrandfossen is the largest settlement on the whole island of Osterøy. Located by the Sørfjorden, it has a regular ferry (the MF Ole Bull) that crosses the fjord to Åsane in Bergen.

The famous Norwegian violinist and composer Ole Bull had his summer house here. In 1858, he bought a farm in Valestrand.  The house was designed during 1865 by his youngest brother, architect Georg Andreas Bull. Ole Bull lived there for a time principally between tours. In 1872, he bought property on the island of Lysøen in what is now Bjørnafjorden Municipality, south of Bergen which became the primary residence of his family.

References

Villages in Vestland
Osterøy